Football at the 2008 Summer Olympics was held in Beijing and several other cities in the People's Republic of China from 6 to 23 August. Associations affiliated with FIFA were invited to send their full women's national teams and men's U-23 teams to participate. Men's teams were allowed to augment their squad with three players over the age of 23.

For these games, the men competed in a 16-team tournament, and the women in a 12-team tournament. Preliminary matches commenced two days before the Opening Ceremony of the Games on 8 August.

Venues
Aside from the host city Beijing, football matches took place in four other cities:
 Beijing: Beijing National Stadium
 Beijing: Workers' Stadium
 Qinhuangdao: Qinhuangdao Olympic Stadium
 Shanghai: Shanghai Stadium
 Shenyang: Shenyang Olympic Stadium
 Tianjin: Tianjin Olympic Centre Stadium

Men

Women

See also
Football 5-a-side at the 2008 Summer Paralympics
Football 7-a-side at the 2008 Summer Paralympics

References

Olympic Football Tournaments Beijing 2008 – Men, FIFA.com
Olympic Football Tournaments Beijing 2008 – Women, FIFA.com
RSSSF

External links

Football – Official Results Book

 
2008
2008 in association football
Football
International association football competitions hosted by China